Black Men United (B.M.U.) was a collaboration of many African-American male R&B, neo soul and soul music artists.  Their only song "U Will Know", written by a young D'Angelo, was released in 1994. It was featured in the film Jason's Lyric, and on the film's soundtrack.

History

Artists involved 
Many artists contributed to this effort.  They include:

Aaron Hall
After 7
Al B. Sure!
Boyz II Men
Brian McKnight
Christopher Williams
D.R.S.
D'Angelo (songwriter)
Damion Hall
El DeBarge
Gerald LeVert
H-Town
Intro
Joe 
Keith Sweat
Lenny Kravitz (guitar)
Lil' Joe (from The Rude Boys)
Portrait
R. Kelly
Silk
Sovory
Stokley (lead singer of Mint Condition)
Tevin Campbell
Tony! Toni! Toné! (Raphael saadiq and Dwayne Wiggins)
Usher

Charts

References 

All-star recordings
African-American musical groups
Contemporary R&B supergroups
Musical groups established in 1994
1994 establishments in the United States